Eduard Davydovich Lepin (1889 – 22 August 1938) was a Soviet division commander and Komkor of Latvian ethnicity. He fought in the Russian Civil War against the White movement. Lepin was a recipient of the Order of the Red Banner. 

During the Great Purge, as a part of the so-called "Latvian Operation", Lepin was arrested on 2 December 1937 and shot at the Kommunarka shooting ground on 22 August 1938. In 1956, after the death of Joseph Stalin, he was rehabilitated.

 

1889 births
1938 deaths
Military personnel from Riga
People from the Governorate of Livonia
Lepin
Recipients of the Order of the Red Banner
Soviet military personnel of the Russian Civil War
Soviet rehabilitations
Great Purge victims from Latvia
People executed by the Soviet Union by firearm